Joshua Independent School District is a public school district based in Joshua, Texas, USA.

In addition to Joshua, the district covers a  area in north central Johnson County that includes portions of Cleburne, Burleson, Cross Timber, and Crowley.

In 2009, the school district was rated "academically acceptable" by the Texas Education Agency.

Schools
Ten campuses and centers are in the Joshua Independent School District. Six are located in Joshua, while the remaining four are in Burleson.

Grades 10-12
Joshua High School (Joshua)
Grade 9
Joshua High School Ninth Grade Center (Joshua)
Grades 7-8
R.C. Loflin Middle School (Burleson)
Tom and Nita Nichols Middle School (Burleson)
Grades PK-6
A.G. Elder Elementary School (Joshua)
Caddo Grove Elementary School (Burleson)
H.D. Staples Elementary School (Joshua)
North Joshua Elementary School (Burleson)
Plum Creek Elementary School (Joshua)
Other campuses
Accelerated Learning Center (Joshua)

References

External links
Joshua ISD

School districts in Johnson County, Texas